The God That Never Was is the seventh studio album by Dismember. A music video was made for the track "Trail of the Dead".

Track listing

Personnel
Dismember
 Fred Estby  -  drums, producer, engineering, mixing
 David Blomqvist  -  guitar, Bass
 Martin Persson  -  guitar, Bass
 Matti Kärki  -  vocals

Production
 Peter in de Betou - mastering
 Dan Seagrave - cover artwork
 Janne Wibeck - Assistant engineering
 Carl-André Beckston - layout
 Shelley Jambresic - photography
 Peter Wendin - sound effects

Dismember (band) albums
Albums with cover art by Dan Seagrave
2006 albums
Regain Records albums